Edward James Begley (March 25, 1901 – April 28, 1970) was an American actor of theatre, radio, film, and television. He won an Academy Award for Best Supporting Actor for his performance in the film Sweet Bird of Youth (1962) and appeared in such classics as 12 Angry Men (1957) and The Unsinkable Molly Brown (1964). He was nominated for an Emmy Award for his portrayal of Matthew Harrison Brady in a television adaptation of Inherit the Wind. He is the father of actor and environmental activist Ed Begley Jr.

Early life
Begley was born in Hartford, Connecticut, to two Irish immigrants, Hannah (née Clifford) and Michael Joseph Begley. After he dropped out of school as a fifth-grader, Begley ran away from home several times, going to work for "carnivals, fairs, and small circuses". Later he sold brushes, delivered milk, and served four years in the United States Navy during World War I.

Career
Begley began his career as a  Broadway and radio actor while in his teens.  He appeared in the hit musical Going Up on Broadway in 1917 and in London the next year.  He later acted in roles as Sgt. O'Hara in the radio show The Fat Man. His radio work included Stroke of Fate and a period as Charlie Chan, among other roles. He also starred in the 1950s radio program Richard Diamond, Private Detective, playing Lieutenant Walter Levinson, head of homicide at the 5th Precinct, Manhattan. He was elected a member of The Lambs in 1943. In the late 1940s, he began appearing regularly in supporting film roles.

In the 1952–1953 television season, Begley co-starred with Eddie Albert in the CBS sitcom Leave It to Larry. In 1954 Begley starred in the NBC Television show Robert Montgomery Presents in "Big Boy", an episode sponsored by Lucky Strike, as Joe Grant, an engineer for the Union Pacific Railroad living in Cheyenne, Wyoming, who worked on the famous Union Pacific Big Boy steam locomotives. The show is about how Begley's character copes with the transition from steam locomotives to diesel locomotives in the 1950s.

He won the Academy Award for Best Supporting Actor for his role in Sweet Bird of Youth (1962). Some of his other notable films include Deadline – U.S.A. (1952), 12 Angry Men (1957) as juror #10, The Unsinkable Molly Brown (1964), and Wild in the Streets (1968). One notable role Begley played both on television (twice in 1955) and in the theatrical film (1956) is William (Bill) Briggs, one of the three primary characters in Rod Serling's Patterns.

In 1956, he appeared in the Broadway production of Inherit the Wind, in the role of Matthew Harrison Brady. For this performance, he won the Tony Award for Best Featured Actor in a Play. In 1968 he appeared with Clint Eastwood in the classic western Hang 'Em High.

His other television work included appearances on the 1954 TV series Justice, Empire, The Virginian, Bonanza, The Fugitive, The Dick Van Dyke Show, Target: The Corruptors,  The Invaders, The Wild Wild West, My Three Sons, Wagon Train and Going My Way, with Gene Kelly. Among his many Broadway credits were All My Sons and Our Town.

Personal life
Begley married his first wife, Amanda Huff, in 1922; they had two children. Huff died in 1957. His second marriage ended in divorce and his third wife, Helen, survived him. Begley is father of actor Ed Begley Jr, from his relationship with Allene Jeanne Sanders.

Begley died of a heart attack while attending a party at the home of Jay Bernstein in Hollywood, California, on April 28, 1970. He is buried at the San Fernando Mission Cemetery in Mission Hills, California.

Filmography

Radio

References

External links

 
 
 
 
 

1901 births
1970 deaths
Male actors from Hartford, Connecticut
American male film actors
American male radio actors
American male stage actors
American male television actors
American people of Irish descent
Best Supporting Actor Academy Award winners
Donaldson Award winners
Tony Award winners
Burials at San Fernando Mission Cemetery
United States Navy sailors
20th-century American male actors